Law Latin, sometimes written L.L. or L. Lat., and sometimes derisively called Dog Latin, is a form of Latin used in legal contexts. While some of the vocabulary does come from Latin, many of the words and much of the vocabulary stem from English. Law Latin may also be seen as consisting of a mixture of English, French and Latin words superimposed over an English syntax.

Law Latin was the language in which the legal opinions of English courts were recorded at least until the reign of George II. Under his reign, the Proceedings in Courts of Justice Act 1730 (effective from 1733), mandated that all records of legal proceedings in England were to be made in English rather than Latin. Law Latin was also used as the language of writs, royal charters, letters patent and many other legal instruments. As late as 1867, Law Latin was still in use in England and Scotland for some legal instruments.

See also 
 Law French
 List of legal Latin terms
 Traditional English pronunciation of Latin

References 

Forms of Latin
Latin legal terminology
Common law legal systems